Dublin (Irish: Baile Átha Cliath)  is a city in Laurens County, Georgia, United States. As of the 2020 census, the city had a population of 16,074. It is the county seat of Laurens County.

History
The original settlement was named after Dublin, Ireland.

Dublin, according to a historical marker at the town's main Oconee River bridge, was one of the last encampments at which Confederate President Jefferson Davis and his family stayed before being captured by Union forces in May 1865.

In the Dublin riot of July 1919 there were a series of violent racial riots between white and black members of the community. These were part of a larger series of racial violence during the 1919 Red Summer.

On April 17, 1944, Martin Luther King Jr. gave his first public speech, "The Negro and the Constitution" at First African Baptist Church in Dublin.

Geography
Dublin is located in north-central Laurens County. The town, named such because the Middle Georgia Piedmont reminded Irish settlers of terrain in their native country, was founded on the Oconee River, which starts in the foothills of the Blue Ridge Mountains in northern Georgia before combining with the Ocmulgee River to form the Altamaha, a river which then proceeds to its mouth on the Atlantic Ocean. The Oconee forms the eastern boundary of Dublin, separating it from the city of East Dublin.

Location
The city is located in the central part of the state along Interstate 16. Access to the city can be found from exits 49, 51, 54, and 58. US routes 80, 319, and 441 also run through the city. Numerous state and local highways also run through the city.

Historic districts
Dublin has two historic districts designated by the National Register of Historic Places: the Dublin Commercial Historic District and the Stubbs Park–Stonewall Street Historic District. The Dublin Commercial Historic District consists of the original downtown commercial core, including the earliest extant building in the district: the Hicks Building, dating to 1893. The historic district contains 78 contributing properties, including the Dublin Carnegie Library First National Bank Building, and the former United States Post Office building. Structures within the district represent a wide range of architectural styles, including Colonial Revival, Neoclassical, Commercial, and Art Deco.

The Stubbs Park-Stonewall Street Historic District is located west of Dublin's central business district. The district contains 470 contributing properties, most of which are residential homes constructed between the late 1910s to the early 1940s. The predominant architectural styles of the area consist of Craftsman, Gothic Revival, Folk Victorian, and Georgian Cottage. In addition to historic residences, the district contains properties including historic churches, historic cemeteries, and Dublin's first public park, Stubbs Park.

Climate

}}

Demographics

2020 census

As of the 2020 United States census, there were 16,074 people, 5,520 households, and 3,336 families residing in the city.

2000 census
As of the census of 2000, there were 15,857 people, 6,130 households, and 4,027 families residing in the city. The racial makeup of the city was 51.42% African American, 45.54% White, 0.20% Native American, 1.75% Asian, 0.04% Pacific Islander, 0.29% from other races, and 0.76% from two or more races. Hispanic or Latino of any race were 1.14% of the population.

There were 6,130 households, out of which 31.1% had children under the age of 18 living with them, 39.2% were married couples living together, 23.2% had a female householder with no husband present, and 34.3% were non-families. 31.1% of all households were made up of individuals, and 12.7% had someone living alone who was 65 years of age or older.  The average household size was 2.44 and the average family size was 3.05.

In the city, the population was spread out, with 26.7% under the age of 18, 9.0% from 18 to 24, 24.8% from 25 to 44, 22.2% from 45 to 64, and 17.2% who were 65 years of age or older.  The median age was 37 years. For every 100 females, there were 85.7 males.  For every 100 females age 18 and over, there were 80.2 males.

The median income for a household in the city was $28,532, and the median income for a family was $36,463. Males had a median income of $30,830 versus $21,553 for females. The per capita income for the city was $16,560.  About 22.5% of families and 27.5% of the population were below the poverty line, including 41.1% of those under age 18 and 21.2% of those age 65 or over.

Dublin Micropolitan Statistical Area

Dublin is the principal city of the Dublin Micropolitan Statistical Area, a micropolitan area that covers Johnson and Laurens counties and had a combined population of 53,434 at the 2000 census.

Government

Dublin's city government is made up of a mayor and a city council composed of seven council members. Four of the council members represent wards, or districts, within the city boundaries; the remaining three members are considered council members at large, representing the entire city as legislative members.

Dublin was chosen as a City of Excellence by the Georgia Municipal Association and Georgia Trend magazine in 2000. This distinction recognized Dublin as one of the ten best managed and most livable cities in Georgia when evaluated on areas like public safety, cultural activities, fiscal management, and downtown viability.

In 2005, Dublin was designated as a "Signature Community" by the Georgia Department of Community Affairs. Dublin was also recognized by the American Association of Retirement Communities (AARC) as a Seal of Approval Community in 2009.

The United States Postal Service operates the Dublin Post Office and the Court Square Station in Dublin.

The Carl Vinson Veterans Administration Medical Center is located in Dublin. It was originally commissioned as Naval Hospital Dublin on January 22, 1945, as an ideal location for convalescence from rheumatic fever. As such it was the site of the commissioning of Naval Medical Research Unit Four on May 31, 1946, to study the disease. The Navy transferred the hospital to the Veterans Affairs Department in November 1947, and it was subsequently named for congressman Carl Vinson who was responsible for getting it built in Dublin. Today, the medical center provides a range of services to veterans in Middle and South Georgia, including primary care, mental health, ambulatory and urgent care, optometry, women's health, and extended care. The medical center features a 340 operating-bed facility and has approximately 1,100 employees.

Dublin's Laurens County Library is known for its genealogy department, with archives and records going back two hundred years.

Arts and culture

Theatre Dublin
Theatre Dublin, originally known as the Martin Theater, was constructed in 1934 in Dublin's Historic Downtown Commercial District. The theatre features Art Deco architectural design, with flat symmetrical wall surfacing and horizontal bands, in addition to an overhanging marquee and neon sign.

Since its renovation in 1996, Theatre Dublin has served as a performing arts center for Dublin-Laurens County and surrounding areas. The theatre houses a regular variety of events and performances, including musical artists, plays and performances, orchestras, concerts, and showings of both classical and contemporary films.

Dublin Carnegie Library
The Dublin Carnegie Library was built in 1904 by a grant from Andrew Carnegie. It is located in Dublin's Historic Downtown Commercial District, and the Dublin Carnegie is one of only three surviving Carnegie Libraries in the state of Georgia listed on the National Register of Historic Places and still in its original form. The Dublin Carnegie served as public library for the region until the 1960s, at which point the city and county constructed a larger public library. In the late 1970s, the Dublin Carnegie Library was structurally stabilized and maintained by the Dublin-Laurens Historical Society. For more than 35 years, the building served as the home of the Dublin-Laurens Museum.

In 2014, the Dublin-Laurens Museum moved to a new location, leaving the Dublin Carnegie Library unoccupied. The Dublin Downtown Development Authority then renovated the building to its historic stature, restoring many of the building's original features. Since the renovation by the DDA in 2014, the Dublin Carnegie has served as an event space and fine arts gallery, featuring local and statewide art displays.

Education

Public schools

The Dublin City School District holds pre-school to grade twelve, and consists of two elementary schools, a middle school, a high school, and an alternative school. The district has approximately 2,400 students as of 2016.
Hillcrest Elementary School
Susie Dasher Elementary School
Dublin Middle School
Dublin High School
Moore Street School (Alternative)

The Laurens County School District holds grades pre-school to grade twelve, and serves areas outside of the Dublin city limits.

Private schools
Trinity Christian School

Higher education
Georgia Military College - Dublin Campus
Oconee Fall Line Technical College - South Campus
Middle Georgia State University - Dublin Campus

Notable events

Festivals
Dublin is known for its St Patrick's festival which takes place annually during March.

Sister city
Osaki, Miyagi, Japan

Pageants
Dublin is home to several scholarship pageants, which are largely popular in the southern United States:
 The Miss Saint Patrick's Scholarship pageant, sponsored by the Pilot Club, is held every year in March in conjunction with the Saint Patrick's Day celebration.
 Dublin and Laurens County's America's Junior Miss Pageant is a scholarship competition held yearly for high school juniors. The winners of both the Dublin and Laurens County pageants advance to the state pageant. Its new name is Distinguished Young Women.
 The Miss and Outstanding Teen Irish Capital Scholarship Pageant is an official Miss Georgia and Miss America preliminary pageant and is held in the fall. The Miss Irish Capital Pageant is currently on hiatus and will hopefully return soon. Former Miss Irish Capital winners are: Donna Sellers, Carly Floyd, Amanda Rampley and Brittney Griffith. Former Miss Irish Capital Outstanding Teen winners are: Katie Lassiter, Jordan Mason and Katherine Phipps. Tom Lively started the pageant and was the executive director for the first three years until moving to the Atlanta, Georgia, area and was the executive director of the Miss Southern Empire Pageant for two years. Kenn Nix was the last executive director for the Miss Irish Capital Pageant. They hope to return soon.

In literature
Dublin, the Oconee River, and Laurens County are mentioned in the opening page of James Joyce's Finnegans Wake: "nor had topsawyer's rocks by the stream Oconee exaggerated themselves to Laurens County's gorgios while they went doublin their mumper all the time." (Joyce explained in a letter: "Dublin, Laurens Co, Georgia, founded by a Dubliner, Peter Sawyer, on r. Oconee. Its motto: Doubling all the time.")

Notable people
Jamel Ashley, retired track athlete who competed in the sprint events
Jermaine Hall, basketball player for Maccabi Ashdod of the Israeli Basketball Premier League
Anthony Kewoa Johnson, retired American mixed martial artist who competed in the light heavyweight division of the Ultimate Fighting Championship
 Matt Hatchett - Businessman and politician. He is a member of the Georgia House of Representatives from the 150th District.
 Marcos Knight, professional basketball player
J. Roy Rowland, congressman from 1983 to 1995 and a resident of Dublin
Demaryius Thomas, football player in the NFL for the Denver Broncos
Quincy Trouppe, baseball player in the Negro leagues
Erik Walden, National Football League player
Darrell Williams Jr., football player in the NFL for the San Francisco 49ers
Ron Rogers, retired Football Player at Georgia Tech and in the NFL for the Baltimore Ravens
Leh Keen, racing driver

See also

 List of Irish place names in other countries

References

External links
 
Official website
Dublin-Laurens County Chamber of Commerce
Dublin Carnegie Library
Dublin Downtown Development Authority
Carl Vinson Veterans Administration Medical Center
Theatre Dublin
Dublin St. Patricks Festival

Cities in Georgia (U.S. state)
Cities in Laurens County, Georgia
Dublin, Georgia micropolitan area
County seats in Georgia (U.S. state)